The next general election will be held in Malta by 2027 to elect all members of the House of Representatives. The Labour Party, which had governed Malta since 2013, won a third term in the 2022 election under Robert Abela. Shortly after the election, Bernard Grech was re-elected unopposed for the leader of the Nationalist Party.

Background 
The previous election, which was held in March 2022, saw the Labour Party, which has governed the country since 2013, receive 55% of the popular vote and win 44 out of 79 seats in the House of Representatives. Robert Abela, the Prime Minister of Malta and leader of the Labour Party since 2020, and his new cabinet were sworn in on 30 March 2022. Bernard Grech, the leader of the Nationalist Party, was re-elected unopposed in May 2022.

Electoral system 
MPs are elected from 13 five-seat constituencies by single transferable vote. Candidates who pass the Hagenbach-Bischoff quota in the first round are elected, and any surplus votes transferred to the remaining candidates, who will be elected if this enables them to pass the quota. The lowest ranked candidates are then eliminated one-by-one with their preferences transferred to other candidates, who are elected as they pass the quotient, until all five seats are filled. If a party wins a majority of first preference votes but fails to achieve a parliamentary majority, they are awarded seats to ensure a one-seat majority, if they are one of only two parties to obtain seats. Despite conducting elections under a proportional ranked preferential system, Malta has a stable two-party system, with only the Labour Party and Nationalist Party having a realistic chance of forming a government. Prior to the 2017 election, when the Democratic Party won two seats while running in a joint list with the Nationalist Party, the last time a party other than the Labour Party or the Nationalist Party won seats was in 1962.

In 2018, the government of Malta lowered the national voting age to 16. During the 2017–2022 legislature a gender-corrective mechanism was introduced, with Article 52(A) of the Constitution stating that provides for up to 12 additional seats for unelected candidates from "the under-represented sex" in case one of both makes up less than 40% of the elected MPs.

Political parties 

The table below lists parties represented in the House of Representatives after the 2022 general election.

Pre-election composition

Opinion polls

References 

Opinion polling for future elections
Future elections in Europe
General elections in Malta